Walkerburn Sevens is an annual rugby sevens event held by Walkerburn RFC, in Walkerburn, Scotland. The Walkerburn Sevens was the sixth of the Border Sevens tournaments to be instated, in 1911, after the bigger events of the Border Sevens spring circuit.

The Walkerburn Sevens is traditionally the last tournament of the Sevens season. Although other Sevens events were to join the Borders Sevens Circuit later, the Walkerburn Sevens has  kept its view as a finale from the other tournaments.

The other Borders Sevens tournaments combine in a Kings of the Sevens league; the Walkerburn tournament is called the Prince of the Sevens.

2019's Walkerburn Sevens will be played on 25 May.

Sports Day

Walkerburn RFC introduced a Sports Day in 1911 featuring rugby sevens.

Ballantyne Centenary Trophy

The winner of the Walkerburn Sevens receives the Jeremy Ballantyne Centenary Trophy.

The player of the tournament receives the Davie Campbell Cup. Davie Campbell was a former Walkerburn RFC convener and club stalwart.

Invited Sides

Various sides have been invited to play in the Walkerburn Sevens tournament throughout the years. A touring team from Carlisle RFC was invited in 2010, along with the invitational charity side Pigbarians RFC  The Army rugby union side was invited in 2005 and won the tournament.

Sponsorship

The Sevens tournament is usually sponsored by Glendinning Groundworks as a main sponsor. The club however receives many sponsors; it boasted of a club record of 200 sponsors in 2015.

Past winners

'A' sides are shown where a club had entered two sides in the tournament

See also
 Gala RFC
 Borders Sevens Circuit
 Scottish Rugby Union

References 

Rugby sevens competitions in Scotland
Rugby union in the Scottish Borders